Paul James Scriven, Lord Scriven (born 7 February 1966) is a Liberal Democrat politician and former Leader of Sheffield City Council (2008–11), who was once described as Nick Clegg's "closest ally in local government".

Early and professional life

Scriven was raised on a council estate in Huddersfield, West Riding of Yorkshire. He was educated at Rawthorpe High School, Huddersfield, but after working for two years for a road construction firm, he returned to education at 18 to study his O and A Levels at Huddersfield Technical College. He attended Manchester Polytechnic (now Manchester Metropolitan University) to read for a BA. From 1989 to 1990 he was president of its Students union.

He started his working life 'fast tracked' as a graduate trainee in the National Health Service. He worked at a number of hospitals in the UK and later for a number of private companies. He now  is managing director for a consultancy and leadership  development company Halado Leadership, working mainly with public bodies in southern Africa and South East Asia.

In 2020 Scriven was awarded an Honorary Doctorate from Manchester Metropolitan University for his services to public sector reform and international LGBT asylum issues. Scriven undertook to support the university's first generation programme of supporting more people to go the university from households with a history of family members not entering higher education.

Political career

Scriven was elected to Sheffield City Council in May 2000 for the Broomhill ward and became Leader of the Liberal Democrat Group in 2002. He then became Leader of the Council in 2008, following the local elections which saw the Liberal Democrats take control of Sheffield City Council.

At the 2010 general election, he was the Liberal Democrat candidate for the Sheffield Central constituency, losing to Labour's Paul Blomfield by just 165 votes.

Following the 2010 election, Scriven remained as Leader of the Council and, in November of that year, he received a Leader Award from the Alliance of Liberals and Democrats for Europe, awarded annually to "recognise... the work of outstanding local and regional liberal and democrat politicians".

In April 2011, The Guardian newspaper described Scriven as the "closest ally in local government" to Deputy Prime Minister Nick Clegg MP. In the article, he discussed the coalition government's decision to "front-load" local government spending cuts and claimed it was right to do so, saying it might not have been better to even out the reductions across four years.

In the May 2011 local elections, Labour regained control of the Council and Scriven resigned as Leader of the Liberal Democrat Group.  A year later in the 2012 elections, Scriven lost his Broomhill seat.

On 8 August 2014 it was announced that Scriven had been appointed as a Liberal Democrat life peer. He was made the Baron Scriven of Hunters Bar in the City of Sheffield on 23 September 2014. During his time in the Lords Scriven has worked on issues around human rights abuses in Bahrain, improving the immigration system especially for LGBT+ applicants, campaigning for a federal UK through the regions via radical devolution, local government reform as well highlighting civil liberties issues related to technology and IT.

Scriven was joint acting Liberal Democrat frontbench spokesperson for Health in the Lords during 2020 at the start of the Coronavirus pandemic.  He advocated  for an equal partnership between local and national government that he said was vital to deal with public health issues that would arise.  He also called for a  locally led test and trace system along with realistic support for those who are required to self isolate. Scriven was outspoken in pursuit of holding Conservative Ministers to account for the cronyism in awarding of contracts during the pandemic via the "fast track" channel.

During the 2015 general election campaign, Lord Scriven made media headlines when he claimed on Twitter that Cameron had privately told Clegg that he did not believe the Conservatives would win a majority in a conversation before the election campaign. In the end, the Conservatives won a surprise majority.

In May 2016, Scriven was again elected onto Sheffield City Council, for the Ecclesall Ward.
He announced that he would not be seeking re-election to the Council when his term ended in May 2019.

Lord Scriven made history in July 2017 by becoming the first male in the modern House of Lords, other than clergymen, to speak without a tie in a debate.

Personal life
In June 2017, Scriven married his partner of twenty two years, Dr. David Black.

References

1966 births
Councillors in Sheffield
Living people
Liberal Democrats (UK) councillors
Liberal Democrats (UK) life peers
English LGBT politicians
LGBT life peers
Leaders of local authorities of England
Life peers created by Elizabeth II